Indiana has long been considered to be a Republican stronghold and is rated R+11 on the Cook Partisan Voting Index. The current governor of Indiana is Republican Eric Holcomb, and Republicans hold supermajorities in both chambers of the Indiana General Assembly. It has only supported a Democrat for president four times since 1912- in the elections of 1932, 1936, 1964, and 2008. Historically, the state was a swing state, voting for the national winner all but four times from 1816 to 1912, with the exceptions of 1824, 1836, 1848, and 1876.

Nonetheless, half of Indiana's governors in the 20th century were Democrats. Indiana has also elected several Democrats to the Senate in recent years. Certain cities, too, tend to favor Democrats; Gary, Indiana has had a Democratic mayor for the last 77 years. As while only five Democratic presidential nominees have carried Indiana since 1900, 11 Democrats were elected governor during that time. Before Mitch Daniels became governor in 2005, Democrats had held the office for 16 consecutive years. Since then, however, the office has been held consistently by Republicans since then. Democrats also generally held control of the Indiana House of Representatives during the 1990s and 2000s as well.

Federal elections

Presidential elections

Former governor and U.S. Senator Evan Bayh announced in 2006 his plans for a presidential exploratory committee. His father was a three-term senator who was turned out of office in the 1980 Reagan Revolution by conservative Republican (and future Vice President) Dan Quayle, a native of Huntington in the northeastern portion of the state. However, Bayh announced that he would not be seeking the Presidency on December 16, 2006.

In the 2008 presidential election, Barack Obama carried the state by 1.03%, which was the first time in 44 years that a Democrat won Indiana's electoral votes, and to date, the last.

Congress
Seven of the districts favor the Republican Party according to the CPVI rankings; there are currently seven Republicans serving as representatives and two Democrats. Historically, Republicans have been strongest in the eastern and central portions of the state, while Democrats have been strongest in the northwestern part of the state. Occasionally, certain counties in the southern part of the state will vote Democratic. Marion County, Indiana's most populated county, supported the Republican candidates from 1968 to 2000, before backing the Democrats in the 2004 and 2008 elections. Indiana's second most populated county, Lake County, is a strong supporter of the Democratic party that has not voted for a Republican since 1972.

The state's U.S. Senators are Sen. Todd Young (Republican) and Sen. Mike Braun (Republican). In 2006, then-senior Sen. Richard Lugar (Republican) won reelection to a sixth term with 87% of the vote against no major-party opposition. In 2010, Sen. Coats won reelection to a third non-consecutive term with 55% of the vote against Democratic Congressman Brad Ellsworth and Libertarian business owner and teacher Rebecca Sink-Burris.

Senator Lugar lost in the 2012 Republican primary to the state treasurer of Indiana, Richard Mourdock, who had been favored by the Tea Party movement. Joe Donnelly defeated Mourdock in the general election. He later lost re-election in 2018 to former state representative Mike Braun.

Indiana's delegation to the United States House of Representatives is not completely Republican either. Instead, it has generally served as a bellwether for the political movement of the nation. For instance, Democrats held the majority of seats until the 1994 Republican Revolution, when Republicans took a majority. This continued until 2006, when three Republican congressmen were defeated in Indiana; (Chris Chocola, John Hostettler and Mike Sodrel), giving the Democrats a majority of the delegation again.

Historically, Republicans have been strongest in the eastern and central portions of the state, as well as the suburbs of the state's major cities. Democrats have been strongest in the northwestern and southern parts of the state along with the major cities.  However, outside of Indianapolis, the Chicago suburbs, and Bloomington, the state's Democrats tend to be somewhat more conservative than their counterparts in the rest of the country, especially on social issues.

Indiana's Federal Representation
Indiana currently has 9 House districts In the 118th Congress, 2 of New Jersey's seats are held by Democrats and 7 are held by Republicans. There are as follows:

Indiana's 1st congressional district represented by Frank J. Mrvan (D)
Indiana's 2nd congressional district represented by Rudy Yakym (R)
Indiana's 3rd congressional district represented by Jim Banks (R)
Indiana's 4th congressional district represented by Jim Baird (R)
Indiana's 5th congressional district represented by Victoria Spartz (R)
Indiana's 6th congressional district represented by Greg Pence (R)
Indiana's 7th congressional district represented by Andre Carson (D)
Indiana's 8th congressional district represented by Larry Bucshon (R)
Indiana's 9th congressional district represented by Erin Houchin (R)

Indiana's two United States Senators are Republicans Todd Young and Mike Braun, serving since 2017 and 2019, respectively. 

Indiana is part of the United States District Court for the Northern District of Indiana and the United States District Court for the Southern District of Indiana in the federal judiciary. The district's cases are appealed to the Chiacgo-based United States Court of Appeals for the Seventh Circuit.

See also
Governor of Indiana
Indiana General Assembly
Indiana Supreme Court
Constitution of Indiana
Political party strength in Indiana

References